Stone Blue is the seventh studio album by English rock band Foghat, released in May 1978 on Bearsville Records. "Stone Blue" paired Foghat with producer Eddie Kramer, who had previously engineered recordings for Jimi Hendrix and Led Zeppelin. Kramer and Foghat did not collaborate smoothly, but the tension in the studio may have helped to give the album an added edge. Besides the title track (a Top 40 hit), "Stone Blue" contained a ferocious cover of Robert Johnson's "Sweet Home Chicago," reasserting the band's blues credentials.

Track listing

Personnel
Dave Peverett - rhythm guitar, vocals
Rod Price - lead guitar, slide guitar
Craig MacGregor - bass guitar
Roger Earl - drums

Charts

Certifications

References

1978 albums
Foghat albums
Bearsville Records albums
Rhino Records albums